Graceful Explosion Machine is a 2-D, side-scrolling shoot 'em up developed by Vertex Pop. It was first released in North America and Europe for the Nintendo Switch on April 6, 2017 and later for Microsoft Windows and the PlayStation 4 on August 8, 2017 in the North American and North European regions. The game has received positive reviews from critics.

Reception 
According to Metacritic, the Switch version received a 77/100 from 19 critics indicating "generally favorable reviews". Mitch Vogel of Nintendo Life gave the game a 9/10, calling it "an arcade shooter with a lot of style and a surprising amount of substance". He praised the weapons in the game, noting how each individual weapon's strengths and weaknesses encourage the player to use their full arsenal. He also noted the game's replay value and found it "incredibly satisfying" to return to previous levels to get a high score.

Writing for IGN, Jose Otero liked how each enemy had their own attack patterns which gave them "loads of personality" despite being composed of "basic shapes". He also praised how "stringing together a killer run" provides a "satisfying adreneline rush". He ultimately gave the game an 8.0/10.

A more negative review came from GamesRadar's David Roberts who gave the game a 3/5. Ultimately, he called Graceful Explosion Machine a "decent enough distraction" that "allows you to turn your brain off" when the player has a few minutes to kill.

References 

Nintendo Switch games
PlayStation 4 games
2017 video games
Horizontally scrolling shooters
Video games developed in Canada
Windows games
Single-player video games